The Festival Django Reinhardt is a Gypsy jazz music festival held during late June or early July at Samois-sur-Seine, France. It began as a single evening festival in 1968, but in 1983, became an annual week-long event commemorating Django Reinhardt and his music.  

The festival combines a musical program with creative, leisure and artistic activities about jazz, guitars and Gypsies.

See also 
DjangoFest in the western United States

References

External links 

Gypsy jazz
Jazz festivals in France
Romani in France